Nia DaCosta (born November 8, 1989) is an American film director and screenwriter. She wrote and directed the crime thriller film Little Woods (2018), winning the Nora Ephron Prize at the Tribeca Film Festival. She also directed the horror film Candyman (2021). In August 2020, DaCosta was hired to direct The Marvels, becoming the youngest filmmaker to direct a Marvel film, beating the record set by Ryan Coogler.

Early life and education 
DaCosta was born on November 8, 1989, in Brooklyn and raised in Harlem. She is of Jamaican descent. Her original aspiration was to become a poet.
When DaCosta was 16 years old, she took an A.P. English class, where she was exposed to the work of Joseph Conrad upon reading his book Heart of Darkness.  DaCosta became obsessed with films after watching Apocalypse Now, which led her to study cinema from the New Hollywood era, finding inspiration in directors such as Francis Ford Coppola, Sidney Lumet, Martin Scorsese, and Steven Spielberg. Citing Scorsese in particular as her primary influence, DaCosta enrolled at his alma mater, New York University Tisch School of the Arts. There, she met Scorsese while working as a television production assistant.

Career 
After finishing school, DaCosta began working as a television production assistant, where she worked with filmmakers such as Martin Scorsese, Steve McQueen, and Steven Soderbergh. After DaCosta wrote the script for Little Woods, it was one of the 12 projects chosen for the 2015 Sundance Screenwriters and Directors Labs, where she became friends with Tessa Thompson, who was later cast in the role of Ollie. She funded a short film version of what would eventually become her first feature film through Kickstarter with the help of 72 backers, who eventually raised $5,100. After finishing Little Woods, DaCosta directed two episodes of the third season of the crime drama Top Boy. While working on the series in London, she learned that she was on the shortlist to direct Jordan Peele's revival of the classic horror film Candyman. DaCosta's film Candyman made her the first African-American female director to have a film debut at the top of the box office.

Little Woods 

The film premiered at the Tribeca Film Festival in 2018, and was awarded the Nora Ephron award for "excellence in storytelling by a female writer or director". The film's distribution rights were bought by Neon and was released in theaters in the United States on April 19, 2019. DaCosta cites Debra Granik's Winter's Bone and Courtney Hunt's Frozen River were sources of inspiration for DaCosta's script. In a 2018 interview, DaCosta stated the importance to her of telling stories of "women...who are active" rather than passive figures in movies led by men.

Candyman 

DaCosta was chosen to helm what was described as a spiritual sequel to the original Candyman (1992) in 2018. The film returned to the Chicago neighborhood of the first film. The film was produced by Jordan Peele through Monkeypaw Productions, with Peele citing the original as "a landmark film for Black representation in the horror genre". Yahya Abdul-Mateen II starred in the film, with Tony Todd returning as the film's titular villain, and Teyonah Parris and Nathan Stewart-Jarrett co-starring. Production began in the spring of 2019, and wrapped the following September. Universal Pictures released the film theatrically on August 27, 2021 and received positive reviews.

The Marvels 

In August 2020, DaCosta was hired to direct the upcoming Marvel Studios film The Marvels, the sequel to Captain Marvel (2019), after having initially approached them with a Fantastic Four / X-Men crossover movie. It is currently scheduled to be released on July 28, 2023. This is set to be the first Marvel film directed by an African American woman.

Awards and nominations 
DaCosta was the first African American woman to have a #1 film at the American box office. Her first film, Little Woods, received the Nora Ephron award at the Tribeca Film Festival for "excellence in storytelling by a female writer or director." The film also won Best Narrative Feature and Best Director at the Fargo Film Festival 2019. She also received nominations for her film Candyman for "Most Anticipated Film for the Rest of 2021" at the 2021 Hollywood Critics Association, and won the awards for "Directors to Watch", and "Best Horror Film" respectively. With her directorial work in Candyman, DaCosta received her first nomination at the 53rd NAACP Image Awards for Outstanding Writing in a Motion Picture, and at the Black Reel and Awards for Outstanding Director and Outstanding Screenplay, Adapted or Original.

Filmography 
Short films

Feature film

Television

Theme park attractions
 Avengers: Quantum Encounter (2022)

References

External links 
 
 

1989 births
American people of Puerto Rican descent
Tisch School of the Arts alumni
African-American film directors
Film directors from New York (state)
People from Brooklyn
African-American television directors
American television directors
Living people
American women film directors
American women screenwriters
21st-century American screenwriters
21st-century American women writers
African-American screenwriters
American women television directors